Sweden Day  is a Midsummer celebration honoring Swedish American heritage and history, held annually in New York City since 1941.

This celebration went on hiatus in 1942–45 & 2020.

Festival
The Sweden Day Committee of greater New York sponsors the annual Sweden Day. This traditional event occurs during the summer solstice at Manhem Club, on the sound in Throggs Neck, New York. This festival of Midsummer features the raising of the maypole, traditional food, music, folk dancing, games, prizes and camaraderie. Entertainment is provided by The Swedish Folkdancers of New York.  

Each year one or more persons or organizations are honored for having made a significant contribution or having made outstanding achievements within the Swedish American community. Key events include the selection of the annual Miss Sweden Day Contest and Sweden Day Man of the Year. 

In Sweden, Midsummer's Eve and Midsummer's Day (Swedish: Midsommarafton and Midsommardagen) are traditionally celebrated from the eve of the Friday between the week of June 19–25. The event is considered to be one of the most important holiday of the year and one of the most uniquely Swedish in the way in which it is celebrated.

Sweden Day Scholarship  
Annually Sweden Day Committee Scholarship Awards are  announced during the Sweden Day festivities. Scholarship are available to students entering or enrolled in an undergraduate, graduate or technical program leading to a certificate or degree. The scholarships are named in honor of Alvalene and T. Edward Karlsson, who served for many years as editors of the Swedish language newspaper, Nordstjernan.

See also
NYC Midsummer
National Day of Sweden
Holidays in Sweden
Swedish festivities

References

Other Soureces
Lorenzen, Lily   (1992) Of Swedish Ways  (Harper Perennial) 
 Lago, Don  (2004) On the Viking Trail: Travels in Scandinavian America   (University Of Iowa Press) 
Winquist, Alan H.   (2006) Touring Swedish America: Where to Go and What to See (Minnesota Historical Society Press)

External links
Sweden Day Official Website
Swedish Folkdancers of New York
Swedish Midsummer Ring Dances In New York
Midsummer Ring Dancing at Sweden Day
 

Cultural festivals in the United States
Festivals in New York City
June observances
Summer festivals
Swedish-American culture in New York (state)
Swedish-American history
Throggs Neck, Bronx